Channel 8 is a Thai digital television channel that broadcasts entertainment, foreign TV series, and sports. It is owned and operated by RS Vision Company Limited (a subsidiary of RS Group). The channel is based in Bangkok, Thailand, where it is available on both C and KU bands. Channel 8 broadcasts popular events such as HBO World Championship Boxing plus domestic and self-produced programs.

History 

Channel 8 began broadcasting on a satellite platform in December 2010. It officially launched as a 24-hour free-to-air television channel on 5 January 2011. On 17 August 2013, Channel 8 upgraded its production and broadcast equipment to high-definition. Its HD stream was broadcast on the Thaicom 6 satellite. In December 2013, RS won a license to broadcast Channel 8 on the digital terrestrial television platform in the Variety SD category. Channel 8 officially launched its digital TV channel on 25 April 2014.

Programming 

Channel 8 airs both Thai and foreign dramas, including Korean series and self-produced Thai dramas. Its flagship sports content is boxing. In addition to airing boxing programs from HBO and UFC, Channel 8 produces its own boxing programs.

Notable series
The Doctors (2016)
Uncontrollably Fond (2016)
Love in the Moonlight (2016)
 Sankatmochan Mahabali Hanuman (2017–18)
Eternal Love of Dream (2020)
The Romance of Tiger and Rose (2020)
The Love by Hypnotic (2019)
The Eternal Love 2 (2018)
Put Your Head on My Shoulder (2019)
The Chang'an Youth (2020)
Lost Love in Times (2017)
The Classic of Mountains and Seas (2016)
Legend of Nine Tails Fox (2016)
The Hero Qi Ji Guang (抗倭英雄戚继光) (2015)

Notable sports
 HBO World Championship Boxing
 UFC 196
 Thai Fight
 8 Max Muay Thai
Muay Hardcore
Super Champ Muay Thai
 The Champion
 The Battle and Sang Wien Nak Su
 2014 FIFA World Cup
 La Liga
 FA Cup

Notes

References

External links

Television stations in Thailand
RS Group